Ludmilla Tchérina (born Monique Tchemerzine; ; 10 October 1924 – 21 March 2004) was a French prima ballerina and actress.

Biography
Tchérina was born Monique Tchemerzine, into Circassian aristocracy as the daughter of Kabardian Prince Avenir Tchemerzine, a former Russian general, who had escaped from St. Petersburg, and Stéphane Finette, a French woman.

She studied with Blanche d'Alessandri, Olga Preobrajenska and Clustine. She started dancing at 16 and danced with the Ballet Russe de Monte Carlo, where she was spotted by Serge Lifar. She made her Paris debut creating the rôle of Juliet in his Romeo and Juliet in 1942, becoming the youngest prima ballerina in the history of dance. In 1945 she was a principal dancer with the Ballet des Champs-Élysées and performed in Paris concerts with her husband Edmond Audran. She appeared often with the Paris Opera, the Bolshoi Ballet and the Kirov Ballet as a guest performer.

Tchérina acted in several films including The Red Shoes, The Tales of Hoffmann, Oh... Rosalinda!! and Luna de Miel. She also appeared in television.

Tchérina had a lifelong passion for painting and exhibited in many major galleries. She also conceived and executed several monumental sculptures, including Europe à Coeur, chosen in 1991 by the EU to symbolise the union of Europe and now located at the European Parliament. In 1994 she created Europa Operanda, now installed at the French terminal of Eurotunnel.

Personal life
Edmond Audran, whom she married in 1946, died in a car accident in 1951. She married Raymond Roi in 1953.

She was decorated with the Officier, Légion d'honneur  in 1980.

Death
Tchérina died in 2004, aged 79, and is buried at the Montmartre Cemetery, Paris.

Filmography

External links

Ludmilla Tcherina - Obituary from The Independent (UK)
Ludmilla Tchérina at aenigma
tcherina.com in French
Europe à Coeur (Strasbourg)

1924 births
2004 deaths
Artists from Paris
French ballerinas
French film actresses
Prima ballerinas
Circassian nobility
Russian nobility
French people of Circassian descent
French people of Russian descent
Burials at Montmartre Cemetery
Officiers of the Légion d'honneur
Musicians from Paris
Actresses from Paris
Writers from Paris
Circassians
20th-century French actresses
20th-century French sculptors
20th-century French women artists
20th-century French musicians
20th-century French ballet dancers